Annemabel elongata is a species of beetle in the family Cerambycidae. It was described by Stephan von Breuning in 1939. It is known from Australia.

References

Zygocerini
Beetles described in 1939